Proteinus is a genus of beetles belonging to the family Staphylinidae.

The species of this genus are found in Europe, Japan and America.

Species:
 Proteinus abditus Assing, 2007 
 Proteinus acadiensis Klimaszewski, 2005

References

Staphylinidae
Staphylinidae genera